Ulley Reservoir is a reservoir a few hundred yards to the west and downhill of the village of Ulley,  south of Rotherham, South Yorkshire, England.

History 

The reservoir was built in 1871 by damming the brooks of Ulley and Morthen, to provide the town of Rotherham with approximately 180 million gallons (820 million litres) of drinking water per year. The reservoir is divided in two by a road bridge carrying Reservoir Road; one half is used for angling and dinghy sailing, and the other is now a nature reserve.

The dam is an earth embankment made of a clay core and earth filled shoulders. The spillways and overflow are made of ashlar pitching set on concrete.

In the 1980s it was decided that it was no longer needed for water supplies and was sold to Rotherham council for £1. The council turned the venue into the centrepiece of Ulley Country Park, with the water hosting sailing and fishing.

Ecology 

The reservoir and the surrounding country park are a haven for a variety of wildlife. Over 150 species of flowering plants have been recorded in the park, creating an abundance of both insects and butterflies. The bird species include; mallard, tufted duck, little grebe, great crested grebe, coot, moorhen, dragonfly, kingfisher, grey heron, swallow, swift, house martin and kestrel.

June 2007 cracks in the dam 

On 25 June 2007, cracks in the reservoir walls were found after heavy rains and flooding in the area, causing concerns that the reservoir might burst, prompting the evacuation of the three nearest villages Whiston, Treeton and Catcliffe. Several other areas as far away as Canklow were put on emergency flood alert. The M1 motorway was also closed between junctions 32 and 36 amid fears over safety. This led to 700 local residents being evacuated from their homes. Fire crews used seventeen high volume pumps to remove four million litres of water per hour from the reservoir.

The possibility of the dam being susceptible to cracking had been discussed in 1970, at a conference about problems with dams of a similar age and construction.

It was feared that, if the reservoir's dam was breached, the sudden flow of water could bring down high voltage power lines, and flood the nearby M1 and a crucial regional electricity substation, which supplies the power to the whole of Sheffield.

References

External links 
 Ulley Country Park
 Ulley Sailing Club
 Gold Creek Dam and its Historical Stepped Spillway 
 Chanson, Hubert and Whitmore, Ray L. (1998). Gold Creek Dam and its Unusual Waste Waterway (1890–1997): Design, Operation, Maintenance. Canadian Journal of Civil Engineering, 25 (4), 755–768. 

Drinking water reservoirs in England
Geography of the Metropolitan Borough of Rotherham
Reservoirs in South Yorkshire